The 2008–09 Cleveland State Vikings men's basketball team represents Cleveland State University in the 2008-09 NCAA Division I men's basketball season. The team was led by third-year head coach Gary Waters. In 2007–08, the Vikings finished 21–13 (12–6 in the Horizon League). Cleveland State had their first winning season since the 2000–2001 season when they finished 19–13 overall and 9–5 in conference play. They made their first NCAA tournament appearance since their run to the Sweet Sixteen in 1986. It was the 78th season of Cleveland State basketball.

Preseason 
Cleveland State started the preseason by playing games in Barcelona, Spain. It was also announced that Cleveland State would once again be participating in the ESPNU Bracketbuster games. Cleveland State also made several changes to the schedule. Cleveland State added Syracuse to the schedule, along with moving the former season-opening game against John Carroll to November 10, 2008, from November 14, 2008, and making it the only exhibition game of the year. Next they moved the Oakland game originally scheduled for December 16, 2008, to November 15, 2008, where it will be the season opener. They also moved the site of the three-game CBE Classic from Ft. Myers, Florida (Florida Gulf Coast), to Miami, Florida (Florida International). That meant that Cleveland State will now play Florida International, Toledo, and Tennessee Tech from November 24, 2008 to November 26, 2008. Lastly Cleveland State added La Roche College and Notre Dame College to the schedule, which completed the home scheduling for the year. Cleveland State will play nine teams that made the postseason in total this year. Cleveland State also has no less than 15 home games this year, with 14 of them being regular-season contests. The preseason Horizon League Coaches' Poll picked the Vikings to finish first. J'Nathan Bullock and Cedric Jackson were named to the preseason all-Horizon League first team. On October 27, 2008, Cleveland State announced that head coach Gary Waters was given a contract extension through the 2012–13 season. Also on October 27, 2008, Cleveland State received its first votes of the year, with two points in the AP Top 25 poll, with a ranking of T-50.

Regular season 
Cleveland State participated in the O'Reilly Auto Parts CBE Classic from November 24 – November 26. They won the tournament defeating Saint Leo, Toledo, and Florida International. On December 15, Cleveland State defeated #11 Syracuse at the Carrier Dome, marking the third time that the Vikings defeated a ranked opponent, and the first time it happened on the road. On February 18, 2009 Cleveland State posted its first back-to-back 20 win seasons since 1988. From 1984–1988 Cleveland State won 20 games or more each season. The February 28, 2009 contest against Butler start time was changed from a 2:00 p.m. start to a 12:00 p.m. start to accommodate an ESPN2 broadcast.

Postseason 
After clinching a #3 seed in the Horizon League tournament, the Vikings went on to defeat Detroit Mercy, Illinois Chicago, Wisconsin Green Bay, and Butler on the way to their first Horizon League tournament championship, and second tournament championship in school history.
On March 15, 2009 it was announced Cleveland State would face Wake Forest in the NCAA Tournament. The Vikings received a #13 seed. On March 20, 2009 Cleveland State defeated Wake Forest 84–69 and advanced to the second round of the NCAA Tournament. Cleveland State was eliminated in the second round by losing to Arizona 71–57.

Roster

Schedule

References 

Cleveland State Vikings men's basketball seasons
Cleveland State
Cleveland State
Viking
Viking